Hadiya Davletshina  (real name Hadiya Lutfulovna Davletshina,5 March 1905  – 5 December 1954), was a Bashkir poet, writer and playwright.

Biography
Born 5 March 1905 in the village Khasanovo of Pugachev district in Samara province into a peasant family. Her father's name was Lutfulla Ilyasov, and her mother was Gulyaohar.

Her grandfather was a village mullah.

1920 working as a teacher in the village of Samara province Dengizbaevo;

1920 study in the Tatar-Bashkir Pedagogical College in Samara;

1932 study at the Moscow Institute for the preparation of the editors;

1935 – 1937 studies at the Bashkir Pedagogical Institute;

1933 work in the literary staff of the newspaper BASSR Baimaksky region (along with her husband, writer Bashkir lip Davletshin subsequently Commissar of Education, Bashkir ASSR);

In 1937–1942, as the wife of the repressed People's Commissar of Education of the Bashkir ASSR, Gubay Davletshin, was imprisoned.
In 1942, Davletshina was released due to illness, then to death lived in exile in Birsk.   
She died in 1954 in Birsk from tuberculosis.

Hadiya Ilyasova received her primary education in a rural madrasah, then in a Soviet school. When her father died in 1919, the girl had to take care of the family. Hadiya had to work to feed a deaf mother and three brothers and sisters.

During the Civil War in Russia (1918–1920), Hadiya became one of the first Komsomol (Youth organization) members in the district. From the age of 15, Hadiya Ilyasova began to work as a teacher in the neighboring village of Dengizbaevo. Several times she miraculously managed to escape from the reprisals organized by opponents of the Soviet regime. In 1920, she became a student of the Tatar-Bashkir Pedagogical College in Samara.

In 1922, at the age of 17, she married her fellow countryman Gubay Davletshin, who then worked in the Samara Provincial Committee. In 1923 they had a son, Bulat. But the boy was weak and soon died. They had no more children.

Here she began to study Russian, and first became acquainted with the works of Russian classics. Her favorite writer was Maxim Gorky. Hadiya was greatly impressed by the novel Mother and other works of the writer. Then she worked in schools, was a teacher in an orphanage. In 1932–33, Нadiya studied at the Moscow Publishing Institute. In 1935–37, she was a student of the Faculty of Language and Literature of the Bashkir Pedagogical Institute named after Timiryazev (now Bashkir State University).

In 1933, with her husband, Gubai Davletshin, Hadiya left for the  Baymak district in the south of Bashkortostan , where she worked as an employee of the regional newspaper. In 1934, she participated in the First Congress of Soviet Writers, met with Maxim Gorky. In 1935 she joined the Writers Union of the Bashkir Autonomous Soviet Socialist Republic. In 1936, she was a delegate to the 3rd plenum of writers of the USSR in Minsk. The first story of Hadiya Davletshina, "Hylyukai Pioneer," was published in 1926 in the newspaper "Bashkortostan yeshtere" ("Youth of Bashkortostan"). In 1931, the story "Aybika" was published, bringing the writer wide fame. In 1936, the story was translated into Russian.

For the first time in Bashkir literature, the process of the formation of the personality of a simple Bashkir woman after the 1917 revolution, under the conditions of Soviet power, was deeply and thoroughly shown. Aybika was able to free herself from traditional restrictions and became a tractor driver. So the writer showed an example of the struggle for women's rights.

Hadiya Davletshina wrote a lot and fruitfully. Her poems, essays and stories were constantly published. In 1932, her story "Waves of Ears" was published, later a storybook, the story "Flaming Years".

Everywhere where Davletshins lived, their house was open to friends, relatives, fellow countrymen who needed help. They helped many to get settled in life, to get an education. One of them, the orphan girl Fatima Mustafina, later became the Minister of Education of the Bashkir Autonomous Soviet Socialist Republic.

In the early 30s, the writer began work on the epic novel Irgiz. Some excerpts from it were published in periodicals. For the first time in Bashkir literature, the main character of a major work was the people. The life of the Bashkir people has been shown for two decades against a broad background of social and political events taking place in Russia at the beginning of the 20th century. In her novel, the writer skillfully uses knowledge of the life and way of life of the people, shows the colorful characters and mentality of the Bashkirs.

The use of the wealth of oral folklore, the colorfulness and richness of the language, the epic scale made the novel a classic work not only of Bashkir, but also of all Oriental and Turkic-speaking literature. Speaking at the First Congress of Writers of the RSFSR in 1958, Leonid Sobolev said: "Without knowing Hadia Davletshina’s novel Irgiz, one cannot understand the reality of the Bashkir people." The Kazakh writer Sabit Mukanov called her work a creative feat. Hadiya Davletshina is called the first woman novelist of the East.

The active work of Hadiya Davletshina on the novel was brutally interrupted. 1937–1938 in the history of the Soviet Union are called the period of the Great Terror. In 1937, her husband, People's Commissar of Education of the BASSR Gubay Davletshin, was arrested and later shot. He did a lot for the development of the education and culture of the Bashkir Republic. Hadiya Davletshina, as a “member of the family of the enemy of the people”, was sentenced to five years in prison, which she spent in Mordovia. Here she worked with other prisoners and mentally continued her novel Irgiz. In conclusion, her tuberculosis worsened . In 1942, she was released due to illness. Hadia wanted to return to Ufa, but she was sent to exile in Birsk without the right to leave.

In Birsk, Hadiya Davletshina lived in great need. She was not given work. She was strictly forbidden to publish her works and engage in literary activities. In the last years of her life, she worked as a cleaner at the Birsk State Pedagogical Institute. On 20 March 1951, Hadiya Davletshina wrote a letter to the chairman of the board of the Union of Writers of the USSR, Alexander Fadeev, in which she asked for help with the publication of the novel. This letter is written on six pages, on the sheets there are many spots from the tears of the writer.

In Birsk, after some time, Hadiya married Safin, who took care of her and managed to extend her life a bit. Hadiya Davletshina died on 5 December 1954.She did not see her novel published.
 
The novel "Irgiz" was published only in 1957. It came out in a large circulation in the Bashkir book publishing house. Later it came out in Russian and was published in the languages of the peoples of the USSR. In 1985, a collection of novels and short stories by the writer Aybika was published in Bashknigoizdat. In 2005, the publishing house "Kitap" published the volume of selected works of Hadiya Davletshina.

In 1967, for the novel "Irgiz", the writer posthumously became the first laureate of the Republican Prize of the Bashkir Autonomous Soviet Socialist Republic named after Salawat Yulayev .

Despite a serious illness, Hadiya Davletshina wrote a lot, but her works were not allowed to publish.
After the death of writer, her mother Guliaohar (blind) gave Hadiya`s manuscripts to people who promised to publish them. The investigation has not yet yielded any result.

Creativity 
 The first story "Pioneer Hylukai" was published in the newspaper "Bashortostan yeshtere" ("Youth of Bashkortostan"), 1926;
 the story "Aybika" ("'Aybike' ') 1931;
 the story "Waves of ears" ( 'Bashaktar tulkyny' '), 1932;
 "Collection of short stories", 1935;
 the story "Flaming Years" ( 'Yalkynly Yildar' ), 1933–37;
 Novel "Irgiz" ( "Irgith " ''), 1942–52, published 1957.
 Davletshina, H. Aibika: novel [Text] / H. Davletshin; tr. from bash. R.Akhmedova.-Ufa, 1972.- 78 p.
 Davletshina, H. Irgiz: novel [Text] / X. Daletshina; tr.. from bash. V. Vasilevsky.-M.: Contemporary, 1979.-478

Memory  
 The name of Hadiya Davletshina was assigned to the boulevard in Ufa, the streets in cities and towns of the Bashkortostan.    
 Monuments were erected to her in Birsk and Sibay
 The Republican Prize named after Hadia Davletshina in the field of children's literature 
 G. Shafikov. Hadiya (play)
 R. Nurullin. Hadiya (full-length fiction and publicity film).

Bibliography 
Pearl of Bashkortostan [Text] // Uzikov Yu. Ufa streets names. – Ufa: Ufa Polygraph Combine, 2007.-S.72–74.
Shakur R. The creative feat of the writer (on the 100th anniversary of the birth of Khadia Davletshina) [Text] / R. Shakur // Teacher of Bashkortostan.-2005.-No3.-P.59-60.

Links
 History and culture of Bashkortostan 
 The literary map of the Republic of Bashkortostan  
 Literature in Ufa   
 The Encyclopedia Of Bashkortostan   
 Movies about Hadiya Davletshina

Notes and references

1905 births
1954 deaths
Soviet writers
Socialist realism writers
Soviet poets
Bashkir writers
Bashkir-language poets
Bashkir State University alumni